Alim (ʿAlīm ,  also anglicized as Aleem) is one of the Names of God in Islam, meaning "All-knowing one". It is also used as a personal name, as a short form of Abdul Alim, "Servant of the All-Knowing":

Given name
 Alim ad-Din Ahmad (1884-1920), Bengali activist and revolutionary
Alim Ashirov, Soviet footballer
Aleem Dar (born 1968), Pakistani cricketer
Alim Karkayev, Russian footballer
Alim Khan, Khan of Kokand
Alim Kouliev, Russian-American actor and director
Alim McNeill (born 2000), American football player
Alim Öztürk, Turkish footballer
Alim Qasimov, Azerbaijani musician
Alim Qurbanov, Azerbaijani footballer

Middle name
AFM Alim Chowdhury, Bangladeshi physician
Mohammed Alim Khan, last emir of the Manghit dynasty
Abdul Alim Musa, Muslim American activist and director of Masjid Al-Islam
Mohammad Alim Qarar, member of the Wolesi Jirga for Laghman Province, Afghanistan

Surname
 Issam Alim, Egyptian Islamist
Juice Aleem, British rapper
Mariam A. Aleem (1930–2010), Egyptian artist and academic
Obaidullah Aleem (born 1939), Pakistani Urdu poet

Other uses
 Ulama, plural of 'alim, an Islamic legal scholar

Arabic-language surnames
Arabic masculine given names
Names of God in Islam